Tom Schnell (born 8 October 1985) is a Luxembourgish international footballer who plays club football for Swift Hesperange, as a defender. He is a former Luxembourg national football team player.

External links

1985 births
Living people
Luxembourgian footballers
Luxembourg international footballers
Association football defenders
Union Luxembourg players
Racing FC Union Luxembourg players
CS Fola Esch players
F91 Dudelange players
FC Swift Hesperange players